Crossed fingers is a hand gesture commonly used to wish for luck.

Fingers Crossed may also refer to:

 Fingers Crossed (album), by Architecture in Helsinki, 2003
 "Fingers Crossed" (Agnes song), 2020
 "Fingers Crossed" (Lauren Spencer-Smith song), 2022
 Fingers Crossed, a 2016 album by Ian Hunter and the Rant Band
 "Fingers Crossed", a 2015 song by Billie Eilish
 "Fingers Crossed", a 2021 song by Trevor Daniel and Julia Michaels